This is a list of songs which reached number one on the Billboard Mainstream Top 40 (or Pop Songs) chart in  2011.

During 2011, a total of 18 singles hit number-one on the charts.

Chart history

See also
2011 in music

References

External links
Current Billboard Pop Songs chart

Billboard charts
Mainstream Top 40 2011
United States Mainstream Top 40